Alexey Nikolayevich Shpeyer (1854–1916) was a Russian diplomat.  The Russian government had intended to send him to Korea in 1895 to replace Karl Ivanovich Weber as Russian consul general in Korea, but at the request of King Gojong of Korea's Joseon Dynasty, Weber remained in place, and Shpeyer was sent to Tokyo instead. Shpeyer finally replaced Weber in September 1897. He later served as the chargé d'affaires of the Russian Embassy in Tehran, Persia, and was eventually promoted to the position of Russian Ambassador to Persia.

References

Shpeyer, Alexey
Ambassadors of the Russian Empire to Iran
1854 births
1916 deaths
Ambassadors of the Russian Empire to Brazil
Ambassadors of the Russian Empire to China
Ambassadors of the Russian Empire to Japan